Mirath may refer to:
 Beta Andromedae, a red giant star in the constellation of Andromeda.